Ignatz Waghalter (15 March 1881 – 7 April 1949) was a Polish-German composer and conductor.

Early life
Waghalter was born into a poor but musically accomplished  Jewish family in Warsaw. His eldest brother, Henryk Waghalter (1869-1961), became a renowned cellist at the Warsaw Conservatory. Wladyslaw (1885-1940), the youngest Waghalter brother, became a noted violinist.

Waghalter made his way to Berlin at 17. There, he first studied with Philipp Scharwenka and then came to the attention of Joseph Joachim, the great violinist and close friend of Johannes Brahms. With the support of Joachim, Waghalter was admitted into the Prussian Academy of Arts in Berlin, where he studied composition and conducting under the direction of Friedrich Gernsheim.

Career
Waghalter's early chamber music revealed an intense melodic imagination that was to remain a distinctive characteristic of his compositional work. An early String Quartet in D Major, Opus 3, was highly praised by Joachim. Waghalter's Sonata for Violin and Pianoforte in F Minor, Opus 5, received the prestigious Mendelssohn-Preis in 1902, when the composer was only 21.

In 1907, Waghalter secured a post as conductor at the Komische Oper in Berlin, assisting Arthur Nikisch, where his reputation grew rapidly. That was followed by a brief tenure at the Grillo-Theater, the Stadttheater in Essen (1911–12). Waghalter's appointment as principal conductor at the new Deutsche Opernhaus in Berlin established his position as a major figure in German music. It was inaugurated, under Waghalter's direction, on 7 November 1912 with a performance of Fidelio.

He championed the music of Giacomo Puccini, whose operas had previously failed to win public acceptance in Germany. The first performance of Puccini's La Fanciulla del West in Germany was conducted by Waghalter in March 1913 at the Deutsche Opernhaus. Its triumphant reception secured for Puccini's operas a permanent place in the repertoires of Germany's opera houses. Waghalter also conducted the German debut performances of Tosca and La Bohème and also of Ralph Vaughan Williams' second symphony in 1923.

Three of Waghalter's own operas received their premier at the Deutsche Opernhaus: Mandragola, based on a Renaissance comedy by Machiavelli, in January 1914, which was booked for a European tour but was abandoned with the outbreak of the First World War; Jugend, based on the tragic realistic work by the German dramatist Max Halbe, in February 1917; and Sataniel, inspired by a Polish fantasy tale, in May 1923. The fervent melodicism of these works marked Waghalter as among the most lyrical of German operatic composers in the pre-1933 era.

Waghalter left the Deutsche Opernhaus in 1923. Traveling to the United States, he succeeded Joseph Stransky as musical director of the New York State Symphony, which he held during the 1925 season. Deeply attached to the cultural life of Berlin, Waghalter turned down an offer to remain at the State Symphony and returned to Germany. He assumed the position of Generalmusikmeister of UFA, the country's largest film production company in Germany.

For UFA, Waghalter composed the original musical score for one of the most extraordinary German films of the Weimar era, Hanns Walter Kornblum's Wunder der Schöpfung. The pathbreaking film, which premiered in Berlin in September 1925, attempted to present in a popular cinematic form the greatest discoveries of modern astronomy. His music was described by one critic as a "sensation."

Waghalter composed several operettas, and he was active as a guest conductor. Waghalter was appointed musical director at the National Opera in Riga, Latvia, for the 1931–32 season. Shortly after his return to Berlin, the Nazis came to power.

In 1934, he went into exile, moving first to Czechoslovakia and then to Austria, where he composed his last opera, Ahasaverus und Esther. Several weeks before the Anschluss, when Austria was annexed by Germany, he and his wife fled to the United States.

Later life
Shortly after arriving in New York City, Waghalter initiated a campaign to establish a classical orchestra of African-American musicians. He secured the interest and support of militant New York trade unions, the noted African-American musician Alfred Jack Thomas, and such prominent representatives of the Harlem Renaissance as James Weldon Johnson. The orchestra performed publicly under Waghalter's direction in 1938. However, the project could not obtain sufficient funding to be sustained.

Though Waghalter appeared occasionally as a guest conductor, his opportunities were extremely limited, and he died in relative obscurity in New York in 1949, at 68.

Legacy
Even though he was one of many Central European musicians whose lives and careers were shattered by the Nazi catastrophe, his subsequent and protracted obscurity, when contrasted to the scale of his pre-1933 prominence, is striking. His fate may be explained, to a large extent, by the radical shift in musical aesthetics in the aftermath of World War II. Waghalter did not experiment with atonality and serialism, and his commitment to melodicism placed him well outside the precincts of what was then considered the musical avant-garde. However, more recent critical questioning of atonalism and a corresponding revival of interest in composers who worked in a melodic idiom have encouraged a reconsideration of Waghalter. The Deutsche Oper, the successor of the Deutsche Opernhaus, staged a concert performance of Waghalter's Jugend  in 1989, and a new recording of his early chamber music was released in March 2006

In March 2011 Waghalter's Rhapsody for Violin and Orchestra and Concerto for Violin and Orchestra were recorded by the Royal Philharmonic Orchestra in London, with conductor Alexander Walker and soloist Irmina Trynkos. The CD was released, under the Naxos label, in October 2012. In the liner notes accompanying the CD, Michael Haas - director of Research at the Jewish Music institute's ‘International Centre of Suppressed Music’ at Royal Holloway, University of London, and a leading expert on Central European composers whose careers were effectively destroyed by the Nazi accession to power, describes Waghalter as "one of the most unjustly forgotten musicians of pre-1933 Europe," whose remarkable work compels the listener to wonder "how was it possible that this music went missing for a century?" The December 2012 issue of Pizzicato Magazine awarded the Naxos release a coveted Supersonic designation. In his review, editor-in-chief Remy Franck wrote: "What a discovery: The Violin Concerto of composer Ignatz Waghalter was, with its romantic characteristics, somewhat 'out of fashion' at the time of its composition in 1911 – but the wealth of ideas in this composition is fascinating. And that goes as well for the other works in this CD."

The emotional authenticity and force of his lyricism, combined with the high technical quality of his compositions, may be best appreciated as a distinctive expression of a lost musical culture whose destruction was among the tragic consequences of the barbarism unleashed by fascism in Europe.

Selected works
String Quartet in D Major, Opus 3
Sonata for Violin and Piano in F Minor, Opus 5
Rhapsody for Violin and Orchestra, Opus 9
Concerto for Violin and Orchestra, Opus 15
New World Suite for Orchestra (1939)
 Operas: Der Teufelsweg, Mandragola, Jugend, Sataniel and Ahasverus und Ester
Operettas: Der späte Gast, Wem gehört Helena, Bärbel, Lord Tommy, Der Weiberkrieg, and Ting-Ling
Piano Works: Zwölf Skizzen für Klavier, Opus 17, Drei Klavierstuecke Opus 8, Trois Morceaux, Opus 13
Works for piano and violin: Idyll, Opus 14a, Gestaendnis, Opus 14b
 Several Song Cycles

Waghalter's Autobiography, Aus dem Ghetto in die Freiheit, was published in Czechoslovakia in 1936.

References

External links

 The Waghalter Project on Knucle.tv

1881 births
1949 deaths
20th-century Polish people
20th-century German people
Polish composers
Polish conductors (music)
Male conductors (music)
German male conductors (music)
Jewish classical composers
German Romantic composers
Jewish emigrants from Nazi Germany to the United States
19th-century Polish Jews
Musicians from Warsaw
German opera composers
Male opera composers
Mendelssohn Prize winners
German male classical composers
20th-century German conductors (music)
20th-century German male musicians
19th-century German male musicians